The men's javelin throw event at the 1987 Pan American Games was held in Indianapolis, United States on 15 August. It was the first time that the new model javelin was used at the Pan American Games and, therefore, a new games record was set.

Results

References

Athletics at the 1987 Pan American Games
1987